Sanhe is a township of Kangding in the east of Garzê Tibetan Autonomous Prefecture in western Sichuan province, China, located  from the prefecture seat. , it had 13 villages under its administration.

References 

Township-level divisions of Sichuan
Kangding